William Hughes Miller (born March 16, 1941, Kosciusko, Mississippi) is a professor at the University of California, Berkeley and a leading researcher in the field of theoretical chemistry.

Research and career
Miller is known for his development of semiclassical methods for treating chemical dynamics. From 1989 to 1993, he served as Chair of the Chemistry Department at the University of California, Berkeley, and since 1999 he has been the Kenneth S. Pitzer Distinguished Professor at UC Berkeley.

Awards and honors
In 2011 he became a member of the German Academy of Sciences Leopoldina.

Miller was elected a Foreign Member of the Royal Society (ForMemRS) of London in 2015. His nomination reads: 

Miller was the 2007 recipient of the Welch Award in Chemistry. He is also a member of the National Academy of Sciences and the International Academy of Quantum Molecular Science.

References

1941 births
Living people
Members of the United States National Academy of Sciences
Members of the International Academy of Quantum Molecular Science
UC Berkeley College of Chemistry faculty
Foreign Members of the Royal Society
Harvard University alumni
Georgia Tech alumni
Fellows of the American Physical Society
Members of the German Academy of Sciences Leopoldina